Vaiphei may refer to:
Vaiphei people, an ethnic group who inhabit the North-East part of India, with a distinct language and culture.
Vaiphei language, a Chin-Mizo-Kuki language of India.